Rahmatullah Hanefi is a citizen of Afghanistan.
Rahmatullah worked for an Italian charity named "Emergency", where he was the national staff manager of a hospital the charity ran.

Rescue of Gabriele Torsello
Rahmatullah successfully negotiated the release of Gabriele Torsello, an Italian taken hostage in October 2006.
The Independent reports that Rahmatullah carried a $2 million ransom to secure Torsello's release.

Rescue of Daniele Mastrogiacomo
Daniele Mastrogiacomo, an Italian journalist, was taken hostage by the Taliban, on March 5, 2007.
Rahmatullah was called upon to negotiate his release.

Captured on suspicions of collusion with the Taliban
After Mastrogiacomo's release Rahmatullah was taken into custody by Afghan authorities.

Gino Strada, the founder of Emergency, spoke out on Rahmatullah's behalf:

References

Afghan activists
Living people
Year of birth missing (living people)